Champions League 2018 may refer to:

 2018 AFC Champions League
 2018 CAF Champions League
 2017–18 UEFA Champions League
 2018–19 UEFA Champions League
 2018 CONCACAF Champions League